First Baptist Church is a historic Baptist church complex located at Brockport in Monroe County, New York. It was built between 1924 and 1929, and consists of a Collegiate Gothic–style church building with an attached Tudor Revival Social and Recreational wing. The church is constructed of red brick with Norristone and Medina sandstone trim. It has a slate-covered gable roof and features engaged square towers flanking the main entrance. The Social and Recreational wing has a red brick first floor and half-timbered and stucco second story. It has Norristone trim and a hipped slate roof.

It was listed on the National Register of Historic Places in 2011.

References

Brockport, New York
Churches on the National Register of Historic Places in New York (state)
Baptist churches in New York (state)
Churches completed in 1929
20th-century Baptist churches in the United States
Collegiate Gothic architecture in New York (state)
Tudor Revival architecture in New York (state)
Churches in Monroe County, New York
Gothic Revival church buildings in New York (state)
National Register of Historic Places in Monroe County, New York